Ballads – The Love Song Collection is the second compilation album released by Irish boyband Boyzone. The album contains a selection of material recorded between 1994–1999, as well as the previously unreleased recording, "Your Song". The album was released on 17 March 2003, under Universal Records. The album was certified Gold in the UK. Asian copies of the album also came packaged with a bonus VCD, which includes a selection of the group's music videos, alongside the previously unreleased video for "And I" selling 150,000 copies.

Track listing
 United Kingdom
 "No Matter What" - 4:33
 "I Love the Way You Love Me" - 3:47
 "Everyday I Love You" - 3:30
 "Baby Can I Hold You" - 3:13
 "Words" - 4:01
 "Mystical Experience" - 4:09
 "All That I Need" - 3:39
 "Coming Home Now" - 3:44
 "Father And Son" - 2:47
 "Ben" - 2:47
 "Love Me for a Reason" - 3:38
 "Isn't It a Wonder" - 3:44
 "Paradise" - 3:32
 "You Needed Me" - 3:28
 "Don't Stop Looking For Love" - 4:19
 "Key to My Life" - 3:48
 "And I" - 4:02
 "Your Song" - 4:00
 "No Matter What" (Video) - 4:33

 United States
 "And I" - 4:02
 "Your Song" - 4:00
 "No Matter What" - 4:33
 "I Love the Way You Love Me" - 3:47
 "Everyday I Love You" - 3:30
 "Baby Can I Hold You" - 3:13
 "Words" - 4:01
 "Mystical Experience" - 4:09
 "All That I Need" - 3:39
 "Coming Home Now" - 3:44
 "Father And Son" - 2:47
 "Ben" - 2:47
 "Love Me for a Reason" - 3:38
 "Isn't It a Wonder" - 3:44
 "Paradise" - 3:32
 "You Needed Me" - 3:28
 "Don't Stop Looking For Love" - 4:19
 "Key to My Life" - 3:48
 "Should Be Missing You Now" - 3:46

 Asia
 Disc One
 "And I" - 4:02
 "Your Song" - 4:00
 "No Matter What" - 4:33
 "I Love the Way You Love Me" - 3:47
 "Everyday I Love You" - 3:30
 "Baby Can I Hold You" - 3:13
 "Words" - 4:01
 "Mystical Experience" - 4:09
 "All That I Need" - 3:39
 "Coming Home Now" - 3:44
 "Father And Son" - 2:47
 "Ben" - 2:47
 "Love Me for a Reason" - 3:38
 "Isn't It a Wonder" - 3:44
 "Paradise" - 3:32
 "You Needed Me" - 3:28
 "Don't Stop Looking For Love" - 4:19
 "Key to My Life" - 3:48
 "Greetings & Message From Boyzone" / "Should Be Missing You Now" - 6:48 (Hidden Track)

 Disc Two
 "And I" (Video)
 "Everyday I Love You" (Video)
 "Love Me for a Reason" (Video)
 "Words" (Video)
 "No Matter What" (Video)
 "1998 Interview"

Charts

Weekly charts

Year-end charts

Credits

Boyzone – Vocals
Mike Mangini – Guitar, Producer
James McNally – Accordion, Whistle
Ann Morfee – Violin
Steve Morris – Violin
Tessa Niles – Background Vocals
Graeme Perkins – Organizer
Audrey Riley – Cello
 Trevor Steel – Programming, Producer
Miriam Stockley – Background Vocals
Carl Sturken – Arranger, Producer
Philip Todd – Saxophone
Peter-John Vettese – Keyboards
Warren Wiebe – Background Vocals
Gavyn Wright – String Director
Nigel Wright – Keyboards, Producer
Guy Baker – Trumpet
Clare Finnimore – Viola
Matt Howe – Mix engineer
Gillian Kent – Violin
Michael Hart Thompson – Guitar
Jeremy Wheatley – Mix engineer
Andy Caine – Background Vocals
Clare Thompson – Violin
Bruce White – Viola
John Matthews – Background Vocals
Andy Earl – Photography
Alex Black – Assistant Engineer
Tim Willis – Assistant Engineer
Ben Allen – Guitar
John R. Angier – Keyboards
Emma Black – Cello
Deborah Widdup – Violin
Nastee – DJ
Anna Hemery – Violin
Wayne Hector – Background Vocals, Vocal Arrangement
Yvonne John Lewis – Background Vocals
Absolute – Producer, Mix engineer
Richard George – Violin
Skoti-Alain Elliot – Bass, Programming, Track Engineer
Laura Melhuish – Violin
Orla Quirke – Design, Direction
Jim Steinman – Producer, Executive Producer
Paul Martin – Viola
Tracie Ackerman – Background Vocals
Tom Lord-Alge – Mix engineer
Andy Bradfield – Remixing
Nick Cooper – Cello
Ian Curnow – Producer
Danny G. – Keyboards
Sue Dench – Viola
Andy Duncan – Drums
Simon Franglen – Keyboards, Engineer, Programming
Scott Gordon – Vocal Engineer
Mark Hudson – Vocal Arrangement, Vocal Producer
Eric Lijestrand – Digital Editing
Steve Lipson – Bass, Producer, Programming, Mandolin

References

2003 greatest hits albums
Boyzone albums
Universal Records compilation albums